The WWA Light Heavyweight Championship (Campeonato Mundial peso Semi Completo de WWA in Spanish) is a singles professional wrestling championship promoted by World Wrestling Association (WWA) in Mexico since 1987.

As it was a professional wrestling championship, the championship was not won not by actual competition, but by a scripted ending to a match determined by the bookers and match makers. On occasion the promotion declares a championship vacant, which means there is no champion at that point in time. This can either be due to a storyline, or real life issues such as a champion suffering an injury being unable to defend the championship, or leaving the company.

It was first won by El Cobarde II in 1987 and has since then been held by at least 9 wrestlers, although records for parts of the title history has not been found. The current champion is Atlantis, who won it in December 2014. Since the WWA titles have been largely unsanctioned since the late 1990s it means that they can be defended on any wrestling show, not just limited to WWA promoted shows.

Title history

Footnotes

See also 
NWA World Junior Heavyweight Championship, predecessor in Jim Crockett Promotions
 WCW Light Heavyweight Championship
WWE Cruiserweight Championship (1996–2007)
 NXT Cruiserweight Championship
 WWF Light Heavyweight Championship

References

External links
W.W.A. World Light Heavyweight Title (Mexico)
WWA World Light Heavyweight Title

Light heavyweight wrestling championships
World Wrestling Association (Mexico) Championships